Geothermal power stations in the United States are located exclusively within the Western United States where geothermal energy potential is highest. The highest concentrations are located in the Mayacamas Mountains and Imperial Valley of California, as well as in Western Nevada.

The Geysers, a complex of 22 geothermal power stations located in Sonoma and Lake counties of California, was the first geothermal area to be exploited for commercial electricity generation when Unit 1 was commissioned in September 1960. The complex was then developed into the largest geothermal field in the world with a nameplate capacity of 1,517 MW and an annual generation of 6,516 GWh in 2018.

Geothermal power stations 
This is a list of all operational geothermal power stations in the United States as of 2018.

Notes

Proposed

See also
List of geothermal power stations
List of power stations in the United States by type

References

External links

 
Geothermal